Czarni Lwów was one of the first Polish professional sports clubs with the well developed football section as well as ice hockey among the several other sports. The football club was started in the late 19th century in Lwów as a school football section Sława Lwów. In 1903 the name was changed and the club became professional.

History
In 1911, together with KS Cracovia and two other teams, Czarni created the Polish Football Association, the predecessor of the modern PZPN national football association. The first football club in Poland, the Czarni (Black, name coined after their black shirts; because of their colours the team was commonly dubbed Powidlaki – an allusion to the plum marmalade colour of their logo) were the best known and most popular sports club in Lwów (together with Pogoń Lwów formed soon afterwards). The official name translates as the First Military-Civil Sport Club Blacks Lwów. Although the main interest of the fans lay in football, soon other sections were opened (ice hockey, boxing, skiing, tennis, athletics). Despite their initial successes and their contribution to the history of football in Poland, the club was largely unsuccessful in league meetings. During their seven years career in the Polish Football League, they scored 141 points, with the total goal quota of 120:186. In 1928 the club came 8th in the league, which was the highest location in its history. However, the following year Czarni's forward Rochus Nastula was the top scorer in Polish Soccer League, with 25 goals scored in one season. In 1933 the club dropped from the first league, but continued to appear in national championships.

In 1935 the club won the Polish Cup (Mistrzostwa Polski). In the same year the club won also the Polish ice hockey title. In 1936 the name was changed back to "Military and Civil Sports Club Sława Lwów". It was disbanded in 1939 by the NKVD who arrested most of its members. The most famous player of Czarni Lwów was Kazimierz Górski.

See also
 History of football in Poland
 Lechia Lwów
 Pogoń Lwów
 Hasmonea Lwów
 Sports in Poland

Association football clubs established in 1903
Association football clubs disestablished in 1939
Lwów District Football League
Polish football clubs in Lviv
1903 establishments in Poland
1939 disestablishments in Poland
1903 establishments in Austria-Hungary
Defunct football clubs in former Polish territories